Sevanthi Sevanthi is a 2006 Indian Kannada language romance-drama musical film directed and written by S. Narayan. The film stars Vijay Raghavendra and Ramya in the lead roles. The film is presented by Parvathamma Rajkumar and produced by Jayamma Chinne Gowda in association with S. A. Chinne Gowda. The music is composed by S. A. Rajkumar who has reproduced the best known Kannada folk songs since the story is about Devu (Vijay Raghavendra), a son of butter seller, who is very good at singing folk songs.

The film upon release met with positive response and ran for a hundred days. Critics noted that the film is enjoyable with quality performances and high-class visuals.

Cast 
 Vijay Raghavendra as Devu
 Ramya as Sevanthi
 Mukhyamantri Chandru
 Doddanna
 Thulasi Shivamani
 Komal Kumar
 Padmini Prakash
 Asha Rani
 Vijaya Krishna
 Suraj
 Jayaram
 Rajesh Balipa

Soundtrack 

All the songs are composed and scored by S. A. Rajkumar. The soundtrack consists of popular Kannada folk songs. The album consists of seven tracks.

References

External links 

 Sevanthi Sevanthi: Regular fare

2006 films
2000s Kannada-language films
Indian romantic drama films
Films directed by S. Narayan
2006 romantic drama films